Keste Miller is a Jamaican politician from the People's National Party. He resigned from the Senate of Jamaica on 10 October 2005, and was succeeded by Donna Scott-Mottley.

References 

Living people
Year of birth missing (living people)
People's National Party (Jamaica) politicians
21st-century Jamaican politicians
Members of the Senate of Jamaica